Nicole LeFavour (born February 8, 1964) is an American politician and educator from Idaho who served as an Idaho State Senator from 2008 to 2012. LeFavour previously served in the Idaho House of Representatives from 2004 to 2008.

Early life, education, and early career

Nicole LeFavour was born in Colorado to Pat and Bruce LeFavour. She grew up in Central Idaho in Custer County, near the Frank Church Wilderness where she later worked. LeFavour received her bachelor's degree in cognitive science from the University of California, Berkeley, and a Master's of Fine Arts in writing from the University of Montana-Missoula. In 2010, LeFavour completed Harvard University's John F. Kennedy School of Government program for Senior Executives in State and Local Government as a David Bohnett LGBTQ Victory Institute Leadership Fellow. She moved to Boise in 1990.

LeFavour taught at the University of Montana from 19891990. In 1991, taught at the Boise River School. She worked for the Snake River Alliance from 19921994. In 1996, LeFavour taught at the Fort Boise School. She was a news reporter for the Boise Weekly from 19971998. She was a board member for the Ada County Human Rights Task Force from 19992002. She was also a board member of the Choices in Community Giving from 20002002 and the Western States Center from 20022005. She worked for the Idaho Center on Budget & Tax Policy from 20002004.

LeFavour owned a small business,  LeFavour Graphic Design, from 2000 to 2005, and has taught writing at The Cabin Literary Center for more than a decade and at the Writers at Harriman program for the past four years. In 2004, she was a lobbyist for the Idaho Community Action Network. In 2007, LeFavour was a delegate for the European Human Rights Mission.

Idaho House of Representatives (2004-2008)

Elections
In 2004, incumbent Democrat State Representative Ken Robison of Idaho's 19B House District decided to retire. LeFavour decided to run in the 19th district, which was placed in parts of the city of Boise. She won the three-way Democratic primary with 2,163 votes (54.55%). She won the general election with 13,350 votes (67.2%). In 2006, she ran unopposed and won re-election to a second term with 14,217 votes.

Tenure
In 2006, LeFavour criticized the passage of Idaho Amendment 2, which made it unconstitutional for Idaho to recognize or perform same-sex marriages or civil unions.

She has heavily criticized many of the state's budgets which have in her view cut taxes and spending too much, thus eliminating thousands of jobs. In 2007, she was named "Idaho Business Review Women of the Year".

She fought to reduce prison population by improving the state's substance abuse and mental health programs. In 2008, LeFavour was named "Legislator of the Year" by the Idaho State Planning Council on Mental Health.

Committee assignments

Environment, Energy and Technology
Judiciary, Rules and Administration
Revenue and Taxation

Idaho Senate (20082012)

Elections
LeFavour announced in March 2008 she would retire from the Idaho House to run for the 19th Senate District, seeking the seat being vacated by retiring Democratic State Senator F. Michael Burkett. In the general election, LeFavour defeated Chuck Meissner with 15,163 votes (71.3%). In 2010, LeFavour was re-elected to a second term with 10,246 votes (68.8%).

Tenure

LeFavour was extremely active in Idaho's Add The Words campaign, which ultimately did not make it out of committee. She proposed amending Idaho's Human Rights Act to cover discrimination on the basis of sexual orientation and gender identity.

She was twice elected to the Legislative Council by her peers. LeFavour was an advocate for increased spending in Idaho schools and access to mental health/substance abuse treatment programs.

Committee assignments
Her past committee assignments were:
Education
Judiciary and Rules
Joint Finance and Appropriations Committee.

2012 congressional election

In February 2012, LeFavour announced that she would not be seeking re-election to the state legislature, but announced her candidacy for the United States Congress in Idaho's 2nd District the following month. She challenged seven-term Republican U.S. Congressman Mike Simpson, whom she debated twice and criticized as being only superficially moderate, citing his vote against discrimination protections for women in the workplace.
Had she been elected, she would have been the second openly lesbian member of the U.S. Congress, but polled 34.8% of the vote. This was in and of itself the strongest showing of any Democratic candidate against Mike Simpson as an incumbent: Craig Williams got 25.9% of the vote in 2000, Edward Kinghorn 29.0% in 2002, Lin Witworth 29.3% in 2004, Jim D. Hansen 34.43% in 2006, Deborah Holmes 31% in 2008, and Mike Crawford 24.4% in 2010. She noted after the election on her campaign's Facebook page that she had received the most votes in eastern Idaho of any Democrat who had run against Simpson as an incumbent, and that "last but not least, we've put to rest the question of whether Idahoans will actually vote for a gay person."

Continuing advocacy

After her service as a public representative, LeFavour has remained active in LGBT affairs. She was one of 44 activists arrested on February 3, 2014, at the Statehouse on suspicion of misdemeanor trespassing, having blocked the Idaho Senate's entrances for more than two hours in a silent protest two months in the planning  on behalf of the Add The Words campaign, an act of civil disobedience which she had organized. Three of those arrested were juveniles, and LeFavour herself was, unexpectedly, the last person to be arrested after the Idaho Senate voted to suspend its rule which allows former members to be on the Senate floor.

By the end of February, following other protests, 122 arrests had been conducted (with some protestors being arrested for than once, and all of whom are being represented pro bono), and negotiations between LGBT-rights advocates and religiously conservative legislators had tentatively begun. By early March, LeFavour had been arrested four times in five weeks, and in mid-March, was discovered in an act of political theater during a direct action protest after having literally hid in a closet in the Idaho Senate lounge for hours. Ultimately LeFavour has been arrested ten times; at a court hearing in late July 2014 she took a plea deal and was sentenced to seventy hours of community service and fined $70 in court costs.

Awards
1997 Idaho Press Club Award for her story Where Have You Gone, Joe Albertson
2001 United Nations Human Rights Day Award, Idaho Voices of Faith for Human Rights
2001 Women Making History Award, Boise State University Women's Center 
2004 Grassroots Leader of the Year, United Vision for Idaho
2007 Women of the Year Award, Idaho Business Review
2008 Legislator of the Year, Idaho State Planning Council on Mental Health

Personal life
LeFavour's partner more than a decade, Carol Growhoski, was in the later years of LeFavour's service in the legislature invited to participate in the "Legisladies," a social organization of female legislative spouses. (They had married in Idaho's Custer County in July 2017, and had previously been civil unioned in Vermont in 2006). LeFavour was the first ever openly gay member of the Idaho Legislature; her election campaigns have won the backing of the Gay & Lesbian Victory Fund. More recently she has made a personal "It Gets Better" video, in which she noted,When I first walked into this building [the Idaho Statehouse] fifteen years ago to talk to lawmakers about what it was like to be a gay person in Idaho, many didn't think they had ever met anyone gay; sadly, some were cruel... Today, I serve in the Senate next to some of the same people and some have changed... Together, with time, you and I and this world we live in, will work together to make sure it gets better.She is featured in the documentaries Breaking Through (2013)  and Add the Words'' (2014).

In April 2013 she was denied unemployment benefits, inasmuch as elected officials are not eligible.

References

External links

Official government profile at the Idaho Legislature
Campaign website
A documentary on LGBT legislators featuring LeFavour
Add the Words, an Idaho LGBT advocacy group
 4 Idaho website
 

1964 births
Living people
Schoolteachers from Idaho
American women educators
Democratic Party Idaho state senators
Lesbian politicians
LGBT state legislators in Idaho
LGBT people from Colorado
Democratic Party members of the Idaho House of Representatives
San Francisco State University alumni
University of California, Berkeley alumni
University of Montana alumni
Women state legislators in Idaho
Activists from Idaho
21st-century American women